Corvette () was an 8-bit personal computer in the USSR,  created for Soviet schools in 1980s. The first device was a homemade computer, created in 1985 by employees of the Moscow State University for their purposes (physics experiments). The first description was made in the magazine «Microprocessor tools and systems». The PC was named "ПК 8001" (21.08.1985).

Graphics 
This computer had advanced graphic capabilities for its time. It has only one video mode which uses 4 planes: 3 graphic and 1 text.  The graphic planes have 512x256 resolution.  The text plane is capable to show 32x16 or 64x16 text using two sets of 256 ROM 8x16 characters for both modes.  It possible to show 16 colors on screen.  8 colors are free and 8 additional colors can be used combining text symbols and pixels. Any logical color may be any physical color from 0 to 15 (RGBI).  The graphic video RAM size is 192 KB (4 pages) or 48 KB (1 page).  The text video RAM size is 1 KB which is 9-bit static RAM.  There is no contention for access to video and processor RAM.  The Corvette has a way to accelerate filling an area with a given color.  It could be faster than the IBM PC AT with the EGA card for this task.

Sound 
The Intel 8253 is used to generate sound.

Software 
 BASIC interpreter in ROM, fully compliant with the MSX standard, including all graphic commands (drawing points, lines, rectangles, filled rectangles, circles, ellipses, arcs, closed area filling, DRAW), working with integers, etc.
 Operation systems MicroDOS (МикроДОС) and CP/M-80 (with floppy disk driver)
 Text editor «Супертекст», «Микромир» (MIM), etc.
 DBMS dBase II
 Spreadsheet Microsoft Multiplan
 Compilers for Fortran, Pascal, C, Ada, Forth, Lisp, PL/M, etc.
 Software for education
 Games («Berkut», PopCorn, Stalker, Dan Dare, Continental Circus, Deflector, «Treasure», «Winnie the Pooh», «Treasure Island», Super Tetris, Karate, etc.)

Educational computer technology complex 

"НИИСчётмаш" created an educational computer technology complex based on "Corvette"
It includes a teacher's computer (ПК8020, with FDD , a printer port) and about 15 computers for students (ПК8010), connected to the local network (19,5 kbit/s).

Variants 

It has been mass-produced since 1987 year at the plants of the Ministry of Radio Technology (Soviet Union):

thumb|right|Корвет — печатная плата экземпляра 1986 г.в.

Production 
Even though this PC was created in a fairly short time, and the decision to produce a new computer was approved by the Council of Ministers, the start of the mass production was delayed. Although the computer consisted exclusively of components already mastered by Soviet industry, it was not possible to increase production volumes on time, and the supplied components were of very poor quality. In addition, there was a competition with another computer of the same purpose.: UKNC. As a result, deliveries of the new computer were far behind the plan.:

After the collapse of the USSR, the production of Corvettes stopped, and incomplete cases were used to assemble numerous ZX Spectrum clones. "LINTech" ("Laboratory of Information Technologies") carried out the modernization of the "Corvette" - the network was modernized and an IBM PC-compatible computer was installed as the head machine.
Network speed increased from 19.5 kilobits / sec to 375 kilobits / sec.
This revision was recommended by the Ministry of Education of the Russian Federation for use in schools.

Links 
 Forum about educational computer technology complex «Corvette»
 Emulator «Corvette» S. Erohin (Linux)
 Emulator b2m, it can emulate the Corvette (Microsoft Windows)
 Emulator emu80, it can emulate the Corvette (Linux, Microsoft Windows, MacOS)
 Emulator «Corvette» in the OS Android
 About «Corvette»
 «Corvette» documentation
 «Corvette» description in the wiki Emuverse
 «Corvette» characteristics
 Technical documents
 Scheme and description
 «Corvette» ПК8010 / ПК8020 and MSX2: additional tests («Corvette» PC8020 & MSX2)
 PAINT: Korvet VS UKNC
 Games and other programs for «Corvette»

References 

Computer-related introductions in 1987
8-bit computers
Personal computers